The Andorra national beach soccer team represents Andorra in international beach soccer competitions and is controlled by the Federació Andorrana de Futbol (Andorran Football Federation), the governing body for football in Andorra.

Andorra made their debut in 2008 at the World Cup qualifiers. Despite being a small nation, Andorra have been a regular competitor on the international circuit, competing in every season of the Euro Beach Soccer League since their debut (bar 2010). However the team has only managed to record one win from around 30 games played in their history so far, versus Norway in a 2010 exhibition tournament. Andorra compete in Division B of the EBSL.

Current squad
Correct as of July 2016

Coach: Xavier de la Rosa
Technical Assistant: Oscar Brau
Head Delegation: Joan Aguilera

Achievements
 Euro Beach Soccer League Best: 11th place (of 12), Division B
 2011, 2013

Competitive record

Euro Beach Soccer League

FIFA Beach Soccer World Cup qualification (UEFA)

External links

BSWW Profile
Latest squad

National sports teams of Andorra
European national beach soccer teams